Agonidium swahilius is a species of ground beetle in the subfamily Platyninae. It was described by Henry Walter Bates in 1886.

References

swahilius
Beetles described in 1886